Dick Warlock (born February 5, 1940) is an American actor and stuntman. He is known for playing Michael Myers in Halloween II. He also played the android assassin in Halloween III: Season of the Witch and he was Kurt Russell's personal stunt double for over 25 years, also collaborating with such directors as Steven Spielberg and John Carpenter. He was active from 1960 until his retirement in 2002. Warlock lives in Kingsport, Tennessee. He has two sons, Billy Warlock and Lance Warlock, and one daughter, Rhonda.

Filmography

References

External links

1940 births
American male film actors
American stunt performers
Living people
People from Hamilton County, Ohio
Male actors from Ohio
20th-century American male actors